Cryptospira immersa is a species of sea snail, a marine gastropod mollusk in the family Marginellidae, the margin snails.

Description
The shell size varies between 14 mm and 25 mm.

Distribution
This species is distributed in the Bay of Bengal and in the Pacific Ocean along New Caledonia.

References

 Cossignani T. (2006) Due nuove Cryptospira dall'Indo-Pacifico (Gastropoda: Prosobranchia, Marginellidae). Malacologia Mostra Mondiale 51: 5–6.
 Cossignani T. (2006). Marginellidae & Cystiscidae of the World. L'Informatore Piceno. 408pp
 Wakefield A. (2010) A revision of the genus Cryptospira Hinds, 1844 (Caenogastropoda: Marginellidae). Novapex Hors-série 7: 1–55

Marginellidae
Gastropods described in 1865